Tropical Airplay is a chart published by Billboard magazine that ranks the top-performing songs (regardless of genre or language) on tropical radio stations in the United States, based on weekly airplay data compiled by Nielsen's Broadcast Data Systems (BDS). It is a subchart of Hot Latin Songs, which lists the best-performing Spanish-language songs in the country. In 1998, 15 songs topped the chart, in 50 issues of the magazine. Due to damage to the BDS monitors in Puerto Rico caused by Hurricane Georges, the Tropical Airplay chart, along with the other Latin song charts, was not published in the issues dated October 10 and October 17.

At the start of the year, Gisselle was at number one with her first chart-topper "Quiero Estar Contigo". She went on to have another number one in 1998 with a cover version of Lani Hall and Camilo Sestos's "Corazón Encadenado" with Sergio Vargas; it would be the latter artist's only number one. Víctor Manuelle had three number ones in 1998 topping the listing the listing with "Así es la Mujer", "Se Me Rompe el Alma" and "Que Habría Sido de Mí". Following a successful stint with Grupo Manía, Elvis Crespo launched his solo career and released his debut album Suavemente (1998). The album spawned two number one singles: the title track and "Tu Sonrisa". "Suavemente" was the longest-running number one of the year with nine weeks and the best-performing tropical song of 1998. Grupo Manía themselves reached number one with "Me Miras y Te Miro". Marc Anthony was the only other artist to reach number one with more than one track in 1998 with "Contra la Corriente" and "Si Te Vas", the latter a cover version of Pedro Fernández's song.

Other acts to reach number one for the first time include Olga Tañón, Ricky Martin, Servando & Florentino, and Juan Luis Guerra. Servando & Florentino's debut single, "Una Fan Enamorada", spent a total of six weeks on top of the chart. Guerra had the final one of the year with "Mi PC" from the album Ni Es lo Mismo Ni Es Igual (1998), which marked the artist's return to the music scene after a four year absence. Juan Manuel Lebrón (credited as Juanma y su Tuna Para Todo el Año) and Michael Stuart obtained their first and only chart-toppers in the year.

Chart history

See also
1998 in Latin music

References

1998
United States Latin Tropical Airplay
1998 in Latin music